Lorne Davies (August 6, 1930 – February 27, 2015) was an American football and Canadian football coach.  He served as the head football coach at Simon Fraser University from 1965 to 1972 where he was that program's inaugural coach and achieved a record of 34–21–1.

Davies also served as the athletic director at Simon Fraser where he designed and implemented Canada’s first university athletic scholarship programs, promoted female participation in a male-dominated arena, and enabled student-athletes to compete in the United States while receiving a first-rate Canadian university education.

Under Davies' guidance, SFU was the first Canadian institution accepted into the NAIA, allowing SFU athletes further opportunities to compete.

References

1930 births
2015 deaths
Simon Fraser Clan football coaches
Canadian football people from Vancouver